Meysam Naghizadeh (born in Shabestar, East Azerbaijan) is an Iranian football midfielder, who plays for Persian Gulf Pro League club Naft Masjed Soleyman.

Club career

Persepolis
He joined Persepolis in August 2012. He signed a three-year contract until the end of the 2014–15 season. He made his debut for Persepolis against Foolad on August 29 when he was used as a substitute. He scored his first goal in a match against Saipa on 28 February 2013.

Gostaresh
After a season with Tehran giants Persepolis, he joined Tabriz side, Gostaresh with a four-year contract on June 13, 2013.

Club career statistics

 Assist Goals

Honours
Hazfi Cup: 2012–13 (Runner-up)

References

External links
 Meysam Naghizadeh at PersianLeague

Iranian footballers
People from Shabestar
Living people
Machine Sazi F.C. players
Persepolis F.C. players
Pars Jonoubi Jam players
1986 births
Shahr Khodro F.C. players
Gostaresh Foulad F.C. players
Persian Gulf Pro League players
Azadegan League players
Association football midfielders
Naft Masjed Soleyman F.C. players
Mes Rafsanjan players
Khooneh be Khooneh players